East Side Tunnel may refer to two separate tunnels in Providence, Rhode Island:

The East Side Trolley Tunnel, a tunnel undercutting College Hill, still in use today for bus routes
The East Side Railroad Tunnel, a railroad tunnel connecting East Providence to downtown Providence, out of use since 1981